Merton Urban District (1907–1913) and Merton and Morden Urban District (1913–1965) was an urban district in Surrey, England. It was formed in 1907 from the parish of Merton and was expanded in 1913 to take in Morden. The district was abolished in 1965 and its former area now forms part of the London Borough of Merton in Greater London.

History
The district was created in 1907 to cover the ancient parish of Merton. Since 1894 the parish had been part of Croydon Rural District and was locally governed by a parish council, that was created by the Local Government Act 1894. The area of the rural district was within the expanding area of London's southern suburbs and as the population increased it became necessary to reform the local government structures.

Merton was the first parish to be removed from the rural district in 1907. An urban district was formed covering the same area as the parish. In 1913 the parish of Morden was also removed from the rural district and became part of the urban district, which was renamed to Merton and Morden. The separate parishes continued with nominal existence. The boundaries of the district were subject to a minor revision in 1933.

The urban district was abolished in 1965 by the London Government Act 1963 and its area merged with those of the Municipal Borough of Wimbledon and the Municipal Borough of Mitcham to form the London Borough of Merton of Greater London.

Population
The population is separately recorded for each parish until 1951. The population peak was in 1951.

Coat of arms
In 1943, the council was granted a civic coat of arms incorporating Lions from the Garth Family arms and the fret from the arms of Merton Abbey. The motto, "In Libertate Vis", means "Our Strength is our Freedom".

References

External links
A Vision of Britain - history of Merton and Morden UD

History of the London Borough of Merton
Districts abolished by the London Government Act 1963
History of local government in London (1889–1965)
Urban districts of England
Morden